Thomas Roper (1760-1829) was the tenth intendent (mayor) of Charleston, South Carolina, serving two terms between 1799 and 1801. As mayor of Charleston, he was influential in the move to build a chapel at the Charleston Orphan House; it was completed in 1801. He died on April 15, 1829, and is buried in the graveyard at St. Philips in Charleston, South Carolina. Because his only son died without an heir in 1845, Col. Roper's real estate on East Battery and Queen Streets (worth $30,000) passed to the Medical Society of South Carolina. Roper Hospital is named in his honor.

References

Mayors of Charleston, South Carolina
1760 births
1829 deaths